The city of Baltimore currently has six public markets across the city. The Baltimore Public Market System is the oldest continuously operating public market system in the United States. Today, the markets are administered by the Baltimore Public Market Corporation, which was established in 1995 as a non-profit organization.

History
In 1751, twenty years after the founding of Baltimore Town, the first public market house was introduced. Twelve years later, the first market was constructed. At the peak of their operation, there were eleven markets across the city. Responsibility for the markets interchanged to the Baltimore Comptroller's Office in 1857, and then transferred again to the Mayor's Office in 1983.

Current Markets

Defunct Markets

References

Food markets in the United States
Buildings and structures in Baltimore
History of Baltimore
Neighborhoods in Baltimore